Botsford is a village of Newtown in Fairfield County, Connecticut,  United States. The town of Newtown has one political body, but consists of multiple geographic subdivisions. It currently contains a fire department and post office. CT 25 runs along the western part of the village. Botsford was listed as a census-designated place prior to the 2020 census.

Robert Winkler, naturalist and author of Going Wild: Adventures with Birds in the Suburban Wilderness, is a resident.

The Connecticut Green Industries Council, a partner of UConn in the NextGenCT project is headquartered in town. The Council also routinely testifies on agricultural and certain local matters to the Connecticut General Assembly.

Notes

Newtown, Connecticut
Neighborhoods in Connecticut
Villages in Fairfield County, Connecticut
Census-designated places in Fairfield County, Connecticut
Census-designated places in Connecticut